Civil union has been legal in New Zealand since 26 April 2005. The Civil Union Act 2004 to establish the institution of civil union for same-sex and opposite-sex couples was passed by the Parliament on 9 December 2004. The Act has been described as very similar to the Marriage Act 1955 with references to "marriage" replaced by "civil union". A companion bill, the Relationships (Statutory References) Act, was passed shortly thereafter on 15 March 2005, to remove discriminatory provisions on the basis of relationship status from a range of statutes and regulations. As a result of these bills, all couples in New Zealand, whether married, in a civil union, or in a de facto partnership, now generally enjoy the same rights and undertake the same obligations. These rights extend to immigration, next-of-kin status, social welfare, matrimonial property and other areas. Non-married couples are not however permitted to adopt children, although people in non-marital relationships can adopt as individuals.

History
Both the Civil Union Bill and the Relationships (Statutory References) Bill were promoted as part of their Ministerial responsibilities by the Labour MPs and Ministers David Benson-Pope and Lianne Dalziel. The Civil Union Bill was treated as a conscience issue by most parties, including the largest parties on the left and right, and passed its third and final reading by 65 votes to 55.

During consideration of the bill, various amendments were proposed. These included making the issue subject to a binding referendum, (a motion moved by New Zealand First MP Ron Mark who voted for the first two readings of the Bill, but against in its final vote). Another was to replace it with a "civil relationships" bill that would allow any two people to register any personal relationship and to gain joint property rights (moved by National MP Richard Worth, a consistent opponent of the bill). These proposals were dismissed by supporters of the bill as delaying tactics rather than serious proposals and were defeated in Parliament by a block vote of Labour, the Greens, and the Progressives.

The Relationships (Statutory References) Bill was also treated as a conscience vote and passed by 76 votes to 44 votes.

Civil Unions came into effect on Tuesday 26 April 2005 for licence applications and at least two couples had applied for licenses by 9:30 that morning. The first civil union ceremonies were performed on Friday 29 April 2005 (marriage and civil union licences need to be applied for at least three working days before the ceremony).

Public opinion 
Before passage, the New Zealand public supported the bill, with opinion polls indicating around 56 per cent in favour. The bill was controversial in some quarters, attracting strong opposition from the evangelical Destiny Church and the Catholic Church in New Zealand. However, not all Christians were opposed to the Bill. Christians for Civil Unions played a role in the debates along with other Christian groups including the World Student Christian Federation.

In the build up to the vote, there were several instances of anti-gay and lesbian protests and rallies as a way of dissuading public favour. The most publicised rally was the 'Enough is Enough' march through central Wellington, terminating at Parliament, in August 2004. The march was organised by the Brian Tamaki-led Destiny Church and involved thousands of church members and supporters, many wearing black shirts, marching down Lambton Quay punching the air with their fists and chanting 'enough is enough'. Also present on this march were members of the Christian Heritage Party and white supremacist group National Front.

Other protest action saw a theology student cover the windows of David Benson-Pope's South Dunedin electoral office with posters denouncing the bill. These bore the message 'Civil Unions Is (sic) Not Gay Marriage. Yeah Right' in a parody of Tui beer advertisements. Three months after the Civil Union Act came into effect, a Herald-DigiPoll survey revealed that a plurality of people who expressed an opinion either way were happy with the legislation. When asked "whether they were happy or unhappy with the way the law allowing civil unions is working," 46% said they were happy, 35.7% were unhappy, and 18.1% were undecided or refused to comment.

Conservative Christian groups such as Family First New Zealand have questioned the low uptake of civil unions. LGBT organisations claim that this criticism is unfounded as there are fewer divorces after incompatible civil unions than with heterosexual marriages, particularly amongst Christians in the Southern US, who have displayed a higher than average divorce rate. This suggests that LGBT community members and heterosexuals who enter civil unions give more prior deliberation than those who enter heterosexual marriages.

Numbers

As at 31 December 2012, 2455 civil unions were registered to New Zealand residents. These comprised 1920 same-sex unions, of which 1131 had been between females and 789 had been between males, and 535 opposite-sex unions. In addition, 474 civil unions were registered to overseas residents. 124 civil unions had been dissolved.

Forced civil unions

In 2012, National Party MP Jackie Blue submitted a member's bill, the Marriage (Court Consent to Marriage of Minors) Amendment Bill, to address the problem of forced marriages of 16 and 17-year-olds. There are about 80 applications per year for marriages between 16- and 17-year-olds. The bill was picked up by fellow National MP Jo Hayes after Blue left Parliament, and was drawn from the ballot on 13 April 2017.

The bill required 16 and 17-year-olds who wish to marry to apply to the Family Court for the consent of a Family Court Judge, in place of consent from a parent or guardian, and set out how the court is to consider the application. At the Select Committee stage, the bill was broadened to cover civil unions and de facto relationships in addition to marriages, and was retitled the Minors (Court Consent to Relationships) Legislation Bill. The bill passed its third reading on 8 August 2018, received Royal Assent on 13 August and came into force the following day.

See also 

 Marriage in New Zealand
 Same-sex marriage in New Zealand
 LGBT rights in New Zealand
 LGBT in New Zealand
 Property (Relationships) Act 1976

References

External links
 Parliamentary Counsel Office - text of the Civil Union Act 2004
 Department of Internal Affairs on civil unions

Law of New Zealand
Politics of New Zealand
LGBT rights in New Zealand
New Zealand
Marriage, unions and partnerships in New Zealand
2005 in LGBT history